"Afro Blue" is a jazz standard composed by Mongo Santamaría.

Santamaria version

Mongo Santamaria recorded his composition "Afro Blue" in 1959 when playing with the Cal Tjader Sextet. The first recorded performance was on April 20, 1959, at the Sunset Auditorium in Carmel, California, with Santamaría on percussion.

"Afro Blue" was the first jazz standard built on a typical African 3:2 cross-rhythm, or hemiola. The following example shows the ostinato "Afro Blue" bass line. The cross noteheads indicate the main beats (not bass notes).

While the bass sounds the six secondary beats, Paul Horn's flute solo and Emil Richards' marimba solo emphasize the four primary beats. Francisco Aguabella takes the conga drum solo on the first recording, quoting phrases from the vocabulary of the abakuá bonkó drum.

Using brushes, Willie Bobo plays an abakuá bell pattern on a snare drum. This cross-rhythmic figure divides the twelve-pulse cycle into three sets of four pulses. Since the main beats are grouped as four sets of three pulses (dotted quarter-notes in the top example), the bell pattern significantly contradicts the meter. Bobo played this same pattern and instrumentation on the Herbie Hancock jazz-descarga "Succotash."

The harmonic structure of Santamaria's version is a simple B pentatonic blues.

Vocal version
In 1959 lyrics were added by songwriter Oscar Brown. Abbey Lincoln recorded it for her 1959 album Abbey Is Blue. Oscar Brown included it on his 1960 album Sin & Soul. Singers to record the standard include Dee Dee Bridgewater, Dianne Reeves, and Lizz Wright.

Coltrane version
In 1963, John Coltrane recorded "Afro Blue" with Elvin Jones on drums. Jones took the opposite approach of Santamaría, superimposing two cross-beats over every measure of a  waltz (2:3). This particular swung  is perhaps the most common example of overt cross-rhythm in jazz. Coltrane's version of "My Favorite Things", also uses a  waltz rhythm. Roberta Flack's vocal recording of "Afro Blue" (on the 2020 reissue of 1969's First Take) uses Coltrane's arrangement.

Other notable versions
 Melanie De Biasio - Lilies (2017)
 Robert Glasper (with Erykah Badu) - Black Radio (2012)
 Dee Dee Bridgewater -  Afro Blue (1974) and Red Earth (2007)
 Lizz Wright - Salt (2003)
 The Derek Trucks Band - Soul Serenade (2003)
 The Doors - interpolated into the song "Universal Mind" on Absolutely Live (1970)

References

1959 songs
Jazz standards